Ralph Shuttleworth Allen (1817 – 6 February 1887) was a British Conservative Party politician. He was elected as a Member of Parliament (MP) for East Somerset at the 1868 general election, was re-elected unopposed in 1874, and held his seat in the House of Commons until he resigned on 10 March 1879 by becoming Steward of the Manor of Northstead.

References

External links 

Conservative Party (UK) MPs for English constituencies
1817 births
1887 deaths
UK MPs 1868–1874
UK MPs 1874–1880